Yusif Mammadaliyev
Yusuf Mammadaliyev (minister)
Yusif Mammadaliyev (film)
Yusif Mammadaliyev (village)